Yusuf Serdar Çoban (born 14 October 1996) is a German professional footballer who plays as a forward for Verbandsliga Württemberg club TSV Essingen.

Career
Çoban joined the youth academy of Stoke City at the age of 15, and played there for a couple of years before going on loan at Stockport County. He sustained heavy injuries, and moved from the academy to 1899 Hoffenheim II for more playing time. Çoban transferred to Süper Lig club Alanyaspor after a successful season with 1899 Hoffenheim II in the Regionalliga. He made his professional debut for Alanyaspor in a 3–1 loss in the league to Kasımpaşa on 12 August 2017.

References

External links
 
 
 

1995 births
Living people
People from Aalen
Sportspeople from Stuttgart (region)
German people of Turkish descent
German footballers
Footballers from Baden-Württemberg
Association football forwards
National League (English football) players
Regionalliga players
Süper Lig players
TFF First League players
TFF Second League players
VfR Aalen players
Stockport County F.C. players
Stoke City F.C. players
TSG 1899 Hoffenheim II players
Alanyaspor footballers
İstanbulspor footballers
İnegölspor footballers
Berliner AK 07 players
German expatriate footballers
German expatriate sportspeople in England
Expatriate footballers in England